The doubles' sprint competition at the 2021 FIL World Luge Championships was held on 29 January 2021.

Results
The qualification was held at 10:16 and the final at 13:41.

References

Doubles' sprint